Lopharcha kinokuniana is a species of moth of the family Tortricidae. It is found in Japan on the island of Honshu.

The wingspan is 11–15 mm. The ground colour of the forewings is dark brown, overlaid with brown and with reddened metallic transverse strigulae (fine streaks). The hindwings are greyish-brown, but whitish basally.

The larvae feed on Cinnamomum japonicum. They fold the leaves of their host plant, constructing a sword-like case. They feed on the tops of the inner surfaces within the case.

Etymology
The species name is derived from the old name of the type locality, Kinokuni, which is present day Wakayama Prefecture.

References

Moths described in 2008
Lopharcha
Moths of Japan